Mud Pond may refer to:

 Mud Pond (Sunapee, New Hampshire)
 Mud Pond (Delaware County, New York)
 Mud Pond (Morehouse Lake, New York)